The West Caroline Basin is an oceanic basin in the south-west Pacific Ocean north of New Guinea.

Bathymetry and oceanography
The West Caroline Basin is bordered by the islands and banks of Melanesia to the north and west, including the  Caroline and Palau islands, and to the east the Eauripik Rise separates it from the East Caroline Basin.

The West Caroline Basin is separated from the West Mariana Basin by the Caroline Seamounts. Water above this depth can reach the West Caroline Basin without perturbations and temperature and salinity profiles for the two basins are similar.
This trench, the only conduit for bottom waters in the West Caroline Basin, ventilates the basin.

The North Equatorial Current flows westward across the West Caroline Basin between 25°N and 5°N around 170-180°E in February but lies below 10°N in August.  As it reaches the Philippine continental shelf it splits into two currents, the southern branch of which joins the east-bound Equatorial Counter Current.

Tectonic evolution
The West and East Caroline basins have similar but distinct histories.  Sea-floor spreading started  36 Ma along mostly East–North-East-directed axes, except in the eastern West Caroline Basin where anomalies are oriented more East-West.  Spreading continued at a relatively constant spreading half-rate of  until  31 Ma when spreading either ceased or slowed considerably in the western parts of both basins but continued in the eastern parts.  This regime ended  27 Ma in the eastern West Caroline Basin and  28 Ma in the eastern East Caroline Basin.  In the West Caroline Basin a period of intermediate spreading rates which continued until 14.5 Ma is still visible as a sharp north-south decline in sediment thickness in the southern parts of the basin.  The final stage of sea-floor spreading spanned at least the period 12.5–14.5 Ma.

See also
 Caroline Plate

References

Notes

Sources

 
 
 
 

Oceanic basins of the Pacific Ocean